Rhythm Black is the tenth studio album by Japanese J-pop singer and songwriter Maki Ohguro. It was released on 25 June 2003 under EMI Japan.

This album consist of three previously released singles, such as Identity, Katte ni Kimenaide yo and Natsu ga Kuru Soshite. Natsu ga Kuru Soshite coupling song Fowin''' has received special album mix under title Maki's Scat Mix.

In this album Maki becomes self-producer for the first time since her major debut in 1992. The album is released for the first time in Copy Control CD format.

The album reached No. 20 in its first week on the Oricon chart. The album sold 39,000 copies. This is her last album which reached into Top 20 Oricon weekly charts.

Track listing

In media
Natsu ga Kuru Soshite: ending theme for Nihon TV program Sports Uru Sugu''
Identity: image song for Tokyo Broadcasting System Television soccer program

References

Universal Music Japan albums
Japanese-language albums
2003 albums
Maki Ohguro albums